The Universum Bremen is a science museum in Bremen, Germany. Visitors are encouraged to interact with most of the approximately 250 exhibits. It receives on average 450,000 visitors annually.

History

The Universum Bremen opened in September 2000 near to the University of Bremen, Germany. Covering over 4,000 m² the exhibition contains exhibits related to one of the three topics: mankind, earth and the cosmos. The science center building, with its 40,000 stainless steel scales, resembles a mixture between a whale and mussel. It was designed by the Bremen architect Thomas Klumpp.

The company Universum Managementges. mbH runs the science center as a private enterprise. About 3.4 million people visited the Universum in the first seven years since it opened.

In 2007 the Universum opened a large outdoor area, the EntdeckerPark, and a new building, the SchauBox. In contrast to the curved metallic older building, the SchauBox, developed by Haslob Kruse and Partner, is cubic with a rust-red exterior. It is used for additional exhibitions, which change annually.

The EntdeckerPark, the 5,000 m² outdoor area developed by Planungsguppe Grün, offers a number of hands-on exhibits, landscape elements and a 27m-high tower, called the Turm der Lüfte.

The concept of the exhibits and the interior design were realized by Kunstraum GfK mbH, Hamburg and Archimedia, Stuttgart.

References

External links

 Official Homepage
 

Museums established in 2000
Science museums in Germany
Museums in Bremen (city)